Sir Louis Hilton Straker, KCMG (born 23 February 1944) is a politician who served as Deputy Prime Minister of Saint Vincent and the Grenadines from 2015 to 2020. He was the Minister of Foreign Affairs, Commerce and Trade from 2001 to May 17, 2005 when he was transferred to the Ministry of Transport, Works and Housing during a cabinet reshuffle. He became Foreign Minister again in December 2005.

Early life and education 

Straker was born on 23 February 1944 in Layou. He was raised in Saint Vincent and the Grenadines by his father Bertram Augustus Straker.

He was educated at the Layou Government school, then to the Emmanuel High school an later gained higher education at the Hunter College, New York.

Political career 

In the 2001 general election his party gained 69.2% of the vote. The Unity Labour Party gain government and Louis Straker was elected to house of parliament.

In the 2015 general election his party gained 52.28% of the vote with a total of 34,246 of the votes. Louis was once again elected to house of parliament for Central Leeward.

Honours 
Straker was made a Knight Commander of the Order of St Michael and St George in May 6th 2006.

See also
List of foreign ministers in 2017

References

External links
Cabinet biography (2007)

1944 births
Living people
Members of the House of Assembly of Saint Vincent and the Grenadines
Foreign Ministers of Saint Vincent and the Grenadines
Knights Commander of the Order of St Michael and St George
People from Saint Andrew Parish, Saint Vincent and the Grenadines
Unity Labour Party politicians
Recipients of the Order of Brilliant Star